The 2022 Elon Phoenix football team represented Elon University as a member of the Colonial Athletic Association (CAA) during the 2022 NCAA Division I FCS football season. The Phoenix, led by fourth-year head coach Tony Trisciani, played their home games at Rhodes Stadium.

Previous season

The Phoenix finished the 2021 season with an overall record of 6–5, 5–3 CAA play to finish in third place.

Schedule

Game summaries

at Vanderbilt

at Wofford

Gardner–Webb

at No. 14 William & Mary

No. 17 Richmond

Towson

at No. 25т Rhode Island

at No. 25 New Hampshire

No. 12 Delaware

Albany

at Hampton

FCS Playoffs

at Furman – First Round

References

Elon
Elon Phoenix football seasons
Elon
Elon Phoenix football